Pablo Villanueva Fernández (born 12 April 1976), known as Villa, is a Spanish retired professional footballer who played as a forward, currently assistant manager of Premier League club Aston Villa.

Playing career
Born in Alcorcón, Community of Madrid, Villa finished his development with Real Madrid, making his senior debut with the C team in the Segunda División B after being recruited to the academy by Vicente del Bosque. Also during the 1996–97 campaign, he was promoted to the reserves who competed in the Segunda División, his first professional appearance occurring on 2 March 1997 in a 0–2 home loss against UD Las Palmas where he played the full 90 minutes.

Villa spent the following five seasons in the second division, starting out with a loan at Racing de Ferrol. Subsequently, he represented CD Leganés and Córdoba CF, scoring a career-best eight goals (with the professionals) in 2004–05 for the latter side but being relegated.

Villa retired in 2009 at the age of 33 after a spell with CD Guadalajara, due to knee problems.

Coaching career
Villa started working as a manager at amateurs CF Trival Valderas, being in charge of its youth squads. In June 2012, he was appointed manager of Córdoba CF B, replacing Rafael Berges who took the reins of the first team. He finished the season in second place in the Tercera División, being ousted in the play-offs by Granada CF B who were eventually promoted.

Villa was named coach of Córdoba on 27 June 2013, with the club still in the second tier. He was relieved of his duties on 9 February of the following year, due to poor results.

Starting in the summer of 2014, Villa worked with compatriot Unai Emery at several teams. His first one was Sevilla FC, followed by Paris Saint-Germain FC, Arsenal, Villarreal CF and Aston Villa.

Managerial statistics

References

External links

Futbolme profile 

1976 births
Living people
Spanish footballers
Footballers from the Community of Madrid
Association football forwards
Segunda División players
Segunda División B players
CF Trival Valderas players
Real Madrid C footballers
Real Madrid Castilla footballers
Racing de Ferrol footballers
CD Leganés players
Córdoba CF players
CD Guadalajara (Spain) footballers
Spanish football managers
Segunda División managers
Tercera División managers
Córdoba CF B managers
Córdoba CF managers
Sevilla FC non-playing staff
Villarreal CF non-playing staff
Paris Saint-Germain F.C. non-playing staff
Arsenal F.C. non-playing staff
Aston Villa F.C. non-playing staff
Spanish expatriate sportspeople in France
Spanish expatriate sportspeople in England